The contio (plural 'contiones', from the Latin word 'conventio', meaning 'gathering') was a public assembly in Ancient Rome, which existed during the monarchy as well as in the Roman Republic and Roman Empire. At the contio, magistrates informed the Roman citizens on various topics related to politics. The main difference between the contio and other public assemblies in Rome, such as the comitia, is that the citizens who attended contiones did not get to vote. The contio merely served a communicative function, offering magistrates the opportunity to give the people a report of what had been decided during a senate meeting or to discuss a proposed legislative bill (rogatio) in front of the citizens to help them make up their mind before they had to vote on it in other assemblies. Magistrates also used the contio as a means of self-promotion, presenting themselves as capable and honest politicians who kept the interests of the people in mind (in other words, adhered to the popularis ideology), hoping to gain sympathy and support from the people.

Aside from this political assembly, the word contio' could also refer to a type of Roman military speech. On this type of contiones, see section 5.

 Function in Roman politics 
The practice of holding contiones is said to have started under the Roman Monarchy, where the king (rex) was the only one who could summon a contio as well as the sole person who had the right to speak at this assembly. Therefore the contio is assumed to have originated earlier than the other public assemblies in Ancient Rome, since voting assemblies did not yet exist under the monarchy.

The procedure and the function of contiones changed in the Republic and Empire. Every magistrate, as well as tribunes of the people, got the right to call a contio and address the crowd, or invite others to give a speech on a topic of the convener's choice. In theory, a contio could be held anytime, on any day. However, contiones were usually held on two specific occasions: right after a senate meeting and when a new legislative bill (rogatio) had been proposed.

 Giving a report after a senate meeting 
It was a common practice to hold a contio right after a senate meeting, to inform citizens about what had been discussed during the meeting and what decrees had been made. The magistrate who presided over the senate meeting decided who got to speak at this contio. He could choose to address the crowd himself or invite other senators to give a speech. Magistrates who were opposed to a decree that had been presented at this first contio, often chose to hold their own contio a few days later, to share their different perspective.
Roman citizens could not attend senate meetings themselves, for only senators were allowed inside the curia during those meetings. Therefore the contio was an important source of information for citizens to who wanted to know what was going on in politics.

 Discussing a bill (rogatio)Contiones formed a necessary step in the legislative process of validating new laws. When a magistrate or tribune wanted to propose a legislative bill (rogatio) which had to be validated by the voting process in the comitia, the rules for legislative processes ordained the bill to be presented and discussed from various points of view before the people in contiones first. This allowed people to make up their minds on the bill before voting and gave supporters as well as opponents of the bill a chance to share their views and shape public opinion, either in favor of the bill or against it.

 Other occasions 

The two situations described above were the most common occasions on which a contio was held, but there were several special occasions on which this assembly could be summoned as well:

 Before the elections of new magistrates, a contio was held to present the list of candidates and give the citizens some instructions on how to vote.
 Before a census, censors could call a contio to explain the procedure to the people. After the census they likely presented the new lists of senators and equites to the people through this assembly.
 Successful Roman generals often held a contio on the day after entering the city of Rome and celebrating their triumph, delivering a speech on their achievements.
 Contiones were summoned when a public execution was held (with the exception of executions of women).
 When a new magistrate, such as a consul, entered office, he could choose to use the contio to hold a speech to express his gratitude to the citizens for being elected. Magistrates who left office could call a contio as well, to give the people an overview of their political activities and achievements.
The contio was used for some religious matters, such as presenting the names of newly appointed augures, vestales and other priests to the people.
Public funeral speeches (laudationes) in which a magistrate praised a deceased individual on behalf of the community, were held at the contio. The audience 
In theory, every Roman citizen had the right to attend contiones. The crowd at this assembly was seen as a representation of the Roman people (populus) and therefore also referred to by speakers as populus (or Quirites.). However, it is generally assumed that the audience mainly consisted of citizens living within the city of Rome, for those city-dwellers had easier access to the voting assemblies in which they would vote on the bills (rogationes) that were the topic of many contiones. They also seem to have been more willing to participate in politics than their fellow citizens from other areas. Over time, two distinct theories, which try to explain the composition of the audience in more detail, have developed. One theory assumes that contiones were mainly attended by lower-class locals, who lived near the forum on which the assembly gathered, while the second theory states that the crowd mainly consisted of well-to-do, high class citizens:

 Theory 1: an audience of lower-class locals 
This first theory implies that the largest part of the crowd at every contio consisted of the same group of local shopkeepers who lived near the forum and who sometimes seem to even have closed their businesses to attend a contio. These lower-class shopkeepers would have had the most to gain from the measures that were discussed at the contio, such as grain distributions, and therefore they would have been the most interested to go. According to this theory, these shopkeepers were joined by other lower-class Romans who sought to escape their narrow housing conditions by hanging out in public places such as the forum. Therefore, the majority of the crowd would have consisted of lower-class Romans.

 Theory 2: an audience of high class citizens 
A second major theory states that the audience was mainly made up of wealthy, higher-class Romans. According to this theory, regularly attending contiones would have been easier for these well-to-do individuals, since they had more time to spare than lower-class citizens. Moreover, these higher-class Romans would have had the education that was needed to appreciate and understand the argumentation the magistrates used in their speeches, which sometimes included complicated references to history or law. Lastly, this theory states that this class of citizens would have been the most interesting for magistrates to influence through contiones, since these wealthy individuals would in turn have influenced the political opinion among lower-class Romans through patron-client relationships.

 Preserved speeches and other ancient sources 
Despite the frequency with which contiones were held, very few of the speeches delivered in this assembly are fully preserved until this day. Many contio speeches have been lost over time or have never been recorded in the first place, likely because the topics with which they dealt were not significant enough or because the speaker did not use interesting or engaging rhetorical strategies.

Cicero is our main source for this type of oratory. The table below gives an overview of all of his extant contio speeches.

Aside from the ones in the table above, no contio speeches have been fully preserved. There are, however, a few other ancient sources which provide knowledge on this topic. Historiographic works, mainly those of Sallust (a 1st century BC. Roman historiographer) describe some speeches that have been held at the contio on significant topics in Roman history. Moreover, Cicero comments on contiones in several of his works: in De Oratore, we find some theoretical remarks on how to address this assembly (eg. De Oratore 2.333-240) and his letters to Atticus include some references to the contio as well (eg. Att. 7.8.5).

 Rhetoric 
Judging from the ancient source material described above, speeches delivered at the contio seem to have shared several rhetorical and argumentative characteristics. This list gives an overview of such common characteristics of speeches addressed to this assembly:

 Speakers tried to make the audience feel a sense of responsibility or obligation towards the common good and the welfare of the Republic and the community.
 Speakers flattered the citizens and made them feel politically important, which, in turn, would have increased the sympathy the audience felt towards the magistrate who addressed them.
 Speakers focused on 'persona-creation': making themselves appear more reliable, honest and considerate towards the people, while portraying their political opponents as deceptive and unconcerned with the interests of the citizens.
 Speakers presented themselves as a kind of teacher or guide, eager to give the citizens insight in political matters. This is called 'revelatory rhetoric' and is marked by the frequent use of verbs as 'teaching', 'warning', 'demonstrating' and 'explaining' (Latin: docere, monere, ostendere, exponere). This would also have influenced the sympathy of the audience.
 Speakers used the so-called '''popularis-style' of rhetoric, which was characterized by many emotional appeals to the audience, for instance evoking fear or resentment, as well as a vehement delivery style, including variations in tone of voice, animated facial expressions and large gestures.
Speakers used short, sharp phrases, aimed at the crowd, in addition to rhetorical questions, to interact with the audience and to get the crowd to express their support by shouting or cheering.

 Military contiones
Aside from the political assembly, the word contio' could also refer to a type of military speech in which a commander addressed his troops. The rules for summoning contiones of this kind were similar to those for the political assembly: under the monarchy only the king (rex) had the right to do so, while later, during the Republic, every magistrate received this right. They usually appointed the general as the only speaker. Military contiones shared the communicative character of their political counterparts: they did not serve to cast votes or make decisions. A military contio could be held on various occasions:

 At the beginning of a campaign, the new commander usually held a contio to present himself to his troops and to inform them of the objectives of the campaign.
 After a successful battle, a contio was held to praise outstanding soldiers and present them with rewards for their achievements.
 When a riot had taken place among the troops, a general could use the contio to announce the punishments the soldiers would get for their rebellious actions. 
 Military contiones were used to share orders, edicts and important political affairs with the troops.
 A contio'' could be summoned right before a battle to motivate and encourage the soldiers.

References 

Ancient Roman government
Popular assemblies